In physics, circular motion is a movement of an object along the circumference of a circle or rotation along a circular path. It can be uniform, with constant angular rate of rotation and constant speed, or non-uniform with a changing rate of rotation. The rotation around a fixed axis of a three-dimensional body involves circular motion of its parts. The equations of motion describe the movement of the center of mass of a body. In circular motion, the distance between the body and a fixed point on the surface remains the same.

Examples of circular motion include: an artificial satellite orbiting the Earth at a constant height, a ceiling fan's blades rotating around a hub, a stone which is tied to a rope and is being swung in circles, a car turning through a curve in a race track, an electron moving perpendicular to a uniform magnetic field, and a gear turning inside a mechanism.

Since the object's velocity vector is constantly changing direction, the moving object is undergoing acceleration by a centripetal force in the direction of the center of rotation.  Without this acceleration, the object would move in a straight line, according to Newton's   laws of motion.The motion of an object in a circular motion along the circumference of a circle or rotation along a circular path is called circular motion.

Uniform circular motion

In physics, uniform circular motion describes the motion of a body traversing a circular path at constant speed. Since the body describes circular motion, its distance from the axis of rotation remains constant at all times. Though the body's speed is constant, its velocity is not constant: velocity, a vector quantity, depends on both the body's speed and its direction of travel. This changing velocity indicates the presence of an acceleration; this centripetal acceleration is of constant magnitude and directed at all times towards the axis of rotation. This acceleration is, in turn, produced by a centripetal force which is also constant in magnitude and directed towards the axis of rotation.

In the case of rotation around a fixed axis of a rigid body that is not negligibly small compared to the radius of the path, each particle of the body describes a uniform circular motion with the same angular velocity, but with velocity and acceleration varying with the position with respect to the axis.

Formulas

 and the units are radians/second.

The speed of the object traveling the circle is:

The angle  swept out in a time  is:

The angular acceleration, of the particle is:

In the case of uniform circular motion,  will be zero.

The acceleration due to change in the direction is:

The centripetal and centrifugal force can also be found out using acceleration:

The vector relationships are shown in Figure 1. The axis of rotation is shown as a vector  perpendicular to the plane of the orbit and with a magnitude . With this convention for depicting rotation, the velocity is given by a vector cross product as

Likewise, the acceleration is given by

In the simplest case the speed, mass and radius are constant.

Consider a body of one kilogram, moving in a circle of radius one metre, with an angular velocity of one radian per second.
 The speed is 1 metre per second.
 The inward acceleration is 1 metre per square second, .
 It is subject to a centripetal force of 1 kilogram metre per square second, which is 1 newton.
 The momentum of the body is 1 kg·m·s−1.
 The moment of inertia is 1 kg·m2.
 The angular momentum is 1 kg·m2·s−1.
 The kinetic energy is 1 joule.
 The circumference of the orbit is 2 (~6.283) metres.
 The period of the motion is 2 seconds per turn.
 The frequency is (2)−1 hertz.

In polar coordinates

During circular motion the body moves on a curve that can be described in polar coordinate system as a fixed distance  from the center of the orbit taken as origin, oriented at an angle  from some reference direction. See Figure 4. The displacement vector  is the radial vector from the origin to the particle location:

where  is the unit vector parallel to the radius vector at time  and pointing away from the origin. It is customary to orient  to point in the direction of travel along the orbit.

The velocity is the time derivative of the displacement:

Because the radius of the circle is constant, the radial component of the velocity is zero. If the particle displacement rotates through an angle  in time , so does , describing an arc on the unit circle of magnitude . See the unit circle at the left of Figure 4. Hence:

Hence the velocity becomes:

The acceleration of the body can also be broken into radial and tangential components. The acceleration is the time derivative of the velocity:

See the unit circle at the left of Figure 4. Consequently, the acceleration is:

The centripetal acceleration is the radial component, which is directed radially inward:

while the tangential component changes the magnitude of the velocity:

Using complex numbers
Circular motion can be described using complex numbers. Let the  axis be the real axis and the  axis be the imaginary axis.

Since the radius is constant:

where a dot indicates differentiation in respect of time.

With this notation the velocity becomes:

and the acceleration becomes:

The first term is opposite in direction to the displacement vector and the second is perpendicular to it, just like the earlier results shown before.

Velocity
Figure 1 illustrates velocity and acceleration vectors for uniform motion at four different points in the orbit. Because the velocity  is tangent to the circular path, no two velocities point in the same direction. Although the object has a constant speed, its direction is always changing. This change in velocity is caused by an acceleration , whose magnitude is (like that of the velocity) held constant, but whose direction also is always changing. The acceleration points radially inwards (centripetally) and is perpendicular to the velocity. This acceleration is known as centripetal acceleration.

Therefore, the speed of travel around the orbit is

(By rearrangement, .) Thus,  is a constant, and the velocity vector  also rotates with constant magnitude , at the same angular rate .

Relativistic circular motion

In this case the three-acceleration vector is perpendicular to the three-velocity vector,

and the square of proper acceleration, expressed as a scalar invariant, the same in all reference frames,

becomes the expression for circular motion,

or, taking the positive square root and using the three-acceleration, we arrive at the proper acceleration for circular motion:

Acceleration

The left-hand circle in Figure 2 is the orbit showing the velocity vectors at two adjacent times. On the right, these two velocities are moved so their tails coincide. Because speed is constant, the velocity vectors on the right sweep out a circle as time advances.

Non-uniform

In non-uniform circular motion an object is moving in a circular path with a varying speed.  Since the speed is changing, there is tangential acceleration in addition to normal acceleration.

The net acceleration may be resolved into two components: tangential acceleration and normal acceleration also known as the centripetal or radial acceleration. Unlike tangential acceleration, centripetal acceleration is present in both uniform and non-uniform circular motion.

In non-uniform circular motion, normal force does not always point in the opposite direction of weight.  Here is an example with an object traveling in a straight path then loops a loop back into a straight path again.

This diagram shows the normal force pointing in other directions rather than opposite to the weight force.  The normal force is actually the sum of the radial and tangential forces. The component of weight force is responsible for the tangential force here (We have neglected frictional force). The radial force (centripetal force) is due to the change in direction of velocity as discussed earlier.

In non-uniform circular motion, normal force and weight may point in the same direction.  Both forces can point down, yet the object will remain in a circular path without falling straight down.  First let's see why normal force can point down in the first place.  In the first diagram, let's say the object is a person sitting inside a plane, the two forces point down only when it reaches the top of the circle.  The reason for this is that the normal force is the sum of the tangential force and centripetal force. The tangential force is zero at the top (as no work is performed when the motion is perpendicular to the direction of force applied. Here weight force is perpendicular to the direction of motion of the object at the top of the circle) and centripetal force points down, thus normal force will point down as well.  From a logical standpoint, a person who is travelling in the plane will be upside down at the top of the circle.  At that moment, the person's seat is actually pushing down on the person, which is the normal force.

The reason why the object does not fall down when subjected to only downward forces is a simple one.  Think about what keeps an object up after it is thrown.  Once an object is thrown into the air, there is only the downward force of earth's gravity that acts on the object.  That does not mean that once an object is thrown in the air, it will fall instantly.  What keeps that object up in the air is its velocity.  The first of Newton's laws of motion states that an object's inertia keeps it in motion, and since the object in the air has a velocity, it will tend to keep moving in that direction.

A varying angular speed for an object moving in a circular path can also be achieved if the rotating body does not have an homogeneous mass distribution. For inhomogeneous objects, it is necessary to approach the problem as in.

Applications 
Solving applications dealing with non-uniform circular motion involves force analysis.  With uniform circular motion, the only force acting upon an object traveling in a circle is the centripetal force.  In non-uniform circular motion, there are additional forces acting on the object due to a non-zero tangential acceleration.  Although there are additional forces acting upon the object, the sum of all the forces acting on the object will have to be equal to the centripetal force.

Radial acceleration is used when calculating the total force.  Tangential acceleration is not used in calculating total force because it is not responsible for keeping the object in a circular path.  The only acceleration responsible for keeping an object moving in a circle is the radial acceleration.  Since the sum of all forces is the centripetal force, drawing centripetal force into a free body diagram is not necessary and usually not recommended.

Afterwards, we can solve for what ever is unknown (this can be mass, velocity, radius of curvature, coefficient of friction, normal force, etc.).

In uniform circular motion, total acceleration of an object in a circular path is equal to the radial acceleration.  Due to the presence of tangential acceleration in non uniform circular motion, that does not hold true any more.  To find the total acceleration of an object in non uniform circular, find the vector sum of the tangential acceleration and the radial acceleration.

Tangential acceleration is simply the derivative of the speed at any given point: .

See also
 Angular momentum
 Equations of motion for circular motion
 
 Fictitious force
 Geostationary orbit
 Geosynchronous orbit
 Pendulum (mathematics)
 Reactive centrifugal force
 Reciprocating motion
 
 Sling (weapon)

References

External links
 Physclips: Mechanics with animations and video clips from the University of New South Wales
 Circular Motion – a chapter from an online textbook
 Circular Motion Lecture – a video lecture on CM
  – an online textbook with different analysis for circular motion

Rotation
Classical mechanics
Motion (physics)